Synchronized skating is an ice skating sport where between 8 to 16 skaters perform together as a team. They move as a flowing unit at high speed over the ice, while performing elements and footwork.

This complex sport originated in 1956 and was initially called "precision skating" due to its emphasis on the maintenance of intricate and precise formations and the requirement of precise timing from all members of the group. Synchronized skating is now well-established as an organized sport in several European countries with several of them having produced teams who frequently win championships at the international level. Currently there are more than 600 synchro teams in United States alone.

Details
Synchronized skating currently uses a judging format similar to singles, pairs and ice dancing. The discipline is primarily judged on skating skills, transitions, performance, composition, interpretation and difficulty of elements.

Each level performs a free skate program that requires elements such as circles, lines, blocks, wheels, intersections, no holds, and, at higher levels, lifts. Teams are required to perform step sequences, ranging in difficulty with each level. In the highest ranking levels, Junior and Senior division teams are required to perform a short program in addition to the free skate. The short program is more technical in nature, whereas the free skating program is longer and provides an opportunity to showcase expression, emotion and interpretation.

Junior level teams compete in the Junior World Synchronized Skating Championships. At the senior level, teams compete at the World Synchronized Skating Championship. All member nations of the ISU are allocated one entry for each level, countries that placed in the top five of the previous championship are awarded two team entries.

A synchronized skating routine may consist of straight line sequences, wheels, blocks, circle step sequences, or also moves in isolation. Moves in isolation, used in advanced levels, consist of one or more skaters separating from the rest of the team to performs freestyle type moves. For example, three figure-skaters may separate and execute sit spins, while the rest of the team is performing a circle formation. The three figure skaters will then re-join the group and carry on with the routine. Similarly, Novice, Junior, and Senior programs include moves in the field. Wherein the whole team performs sets of moves such as biellmann spirals, 170 spirals, unsupported spirals, spread eagles, or Ina Bauers connected.

The required elements must be performed in specific ways, as described by published communications by the ISU, unless otherwise specified. The ISU publishes violations and their points values yearly. Situations warranting deductions in synchronized skating include elements where one-quarter of the team or more fails to execute a maneuver in congruence with the majority of the team, falls, interruptions, illegal maneuvers (such as cartwheels, and violations of the rules concerning time, music, and clothing.

History 

In 1956, the first synchronized skating team was formed by Dr. Richard Porter. The 'Hockettes' skated out of Ann Arbor, Michigan and entertained spectators during intermissions of the University of Michigan Wolverines hockey team. In the early days, precision skating (as it was then called) resembled a drill team routine, or a precision dance company such as The Rockettes.

During the 1970s, the interest for this new sport grew and developed. Teams developed more creative and innovative routines incorporating stronger basic skating skills, new maneuvers and more sophisticated transitions with greater speed, style and agility. Due to the increased interest in the sport in North America, the first official international competition was held between Canadian and American teams in Michigan in March 1976.  With the internationalization of the sport, it has evolved, with increasing emphasis on speed and skating skills, and "highlight" elements such as jumps, spirals, spins, and lifts that originally were not permitted in competition.

Competition elements

Block 
An element where the skaters are lined up in three to five, separate parallel lines. The block should travel over the entire ice surface.  The lines should be straight and evenly spaced.  To increase the difficulty of the block teams can add step sequences, pivot the block, or change the configuration.

Circle 

There are many different ways to complete this element.  Teae circle, multiple circles, a circle within a circle, interlocked circles, or a disconnected circle.  The circle should be evenly spaced between the sand variations, katers and should form a round shape.  To increase the difficulty of a circle a team can include step sequences, traveling, and changes of rotational direction. Assisting of travel can also be present in a circle, and is usually noted by a skater trying to cut through the rotation of the circle on a straight path; this will be noticeable with the same jerky/whipping motion of the circle.

Line 
There are many different types of lines.  Lines can be two parallel lines, one straight line, or a diagonal line.  To increase the difficulty the team may pivot the line, change configuration, or incorporate retrogression into the line.

Wheel 

For a wheel every figure skater must rotate around a common center point.  There are many different formations that teams can form including a two to five spoke or a parallel wheel.  Each spoke (line) of the wheel should be straight and the figure skaters should be leaning into the center of the wheel.  The difficulty of the wheel can be increased by adding footwork, changing the rotational direction of the wheel, configuration of the wheel, or traveling. Traveling is difficult because a lot of the time teams will get called for "assisting the travel" which occurs when a team member (usually towards the center) is doing footwork that is not around the center point that is being traveled, but rather they cut through it on a straight path and stop the flow of rotation in an effort to gain more distance up the ice. More often than not, assisting the travel can be spotted because a) a team member will look out of place and b) the wheel will whip or be very jerky in movement.

Intersection 

An intersection, also known as a pass through, is when the figure skaters skate towards each other in lines and intersect. The intersection can be two lines, such as an angled intersection, but can have three or four lines, such as a triangle or box.  At the point of intersection skaters could do turns or free skating movements to increase the difficulty. The entry to the intersection can be made more difficult by intersecting from an angle or from a whip.

No Hold Element 
The no hold element has the same qualities as a regular block.  The only difference is that the skaters are not connected in a no hold block. The goal of this maneuver is to stay in perfect alignment while doing the footwork. The neater the block and the harder the footwork, the more points a team can receive.

The no hold element can also be used in circle work, creating a challenging and interesting appeal to a basic circle step sequence. Not only does it make it look interesting, but it adds a level of difficulty. The skaters must keep even spacing while rotating the circle, without the assistance of the pull of another skater.

Lift Element 
This is a free skating move where one figure skater holds on to another. Different types of pairs element include spins, lifts, and pivots such as death spirals. Again, this element is really not a necessity for team skating, but it is seen at the Junior and Senior level. A pairs element can be used to boost skating skills and transition scores.

Movement in Isolation 
In this element, some of the figure skaters are isolated from the rest of the team while performing free skating elements such as spins, spirals, lifts, vaults, or jumps.  The free skating elements must be performed by a minimum of three skaters and a maximum of less than half of the team.

Moves in the Field 
This element is a sequence of movements that must include free skating moves such as spirals, spread eagles, Ina Bauers, and other flowing moves with strong edges, connected with linking steps. It must include at least three different free skating moves.

Competitions

International
There are international synchronized skating competitions at the Senior, Junior, and Novice levels (with Senior being the most elite). The International Skating Union held the first official World Synchronized Skating Championships (WSSC) in 2000 in Minneapolis, Minnesota, USA. The top Junior teams from around the world competed from 2001 to 2012 at the ISU Junior World Challenge Cup (JWCC), held in a different location every year. The JWCC were accompanied in 2013 by the ISU World Junior Synchronized Skating Championships, to be held biannually in odd-numbered years with the JWCC in even-numbered years. Other long-running, major international events attracting elite teams at different levels include the French Cup, Spring Cup, Neuchâtel Trophy, Cup of Berlin, Zagreb Snowflakes Trophy, Leon Lurje Trophy and Prague Cup.

ISU World Synchronized Skating Championships

The ISU World Synchronized Skating Championships (WSSC) are the world championships for synchronized skating. Held since 2000, the WSSC is an annual international event organized by the International Skating Union. The top positions have been dominated by Finland, with three different World Champions (Marigold IceUnity, Rockettes and Team Unique) and 19 medals and Sweden with the team (Team Surprise) with most World titles and medals for a single team. Other major countries include Canada with two gold, four silvers and five bronzes (for NEXXICE, Les Suprêmes and the now-discontinued Black Ice), as well as the United States with one silver and four bronzes (for Miami University and Haydenettes, respectively).

ISU World Junior Synchronized Skating Championships

ISU Junior World Challenge Cup
The Junior World Challenge Cup was held bi-annually starting in 2013 alternating with the newly introduced World Junior Championships until being discontinued after the 2015-16 season.

Finland

The Finnish member of ISU, the Finnish Figure Skating Association, holds the Finnish Synchronized Skating Championships at the Novice, Junior and Senior levels. Also, it holds two Finnish Championships Qualifiers before the nationals. Since the late 1990s, the senior-level battle for the qualifier wins and Finnish Championship—and the ensuing ISU World Synchronized Skating Championships (WSSC) entries—has mainly been fought between three teams from Helsinki, Marigold IceUnity, Rockettes and Team Unique, while a fourth and sometimes a fifth Senior team has competed along in the intervening years.

Finnish Senior Championships medalists

Finnish qualifications for the ISU WSSC
Throughout the years, the Finnish senior teams qualifying for the World Championships have been selected based on their performance at the two qualifiers and the national championships. In the season 2012–13, the teams were selected as follows: the Finnish Champion qualified automatically as Team Finland 1 for the WSSC. Team Finland 2 at the WSSC was the team which earned the fewest points from the first qualifier, the second qualifier and the Finnish Championships. The points equaled the sum of the positions at the three competitions with growing coefficients: the coefficient was 0,3 for the first competition result, 0,5 for the second and 1 for the last.

United States
In the United States, there are several other recognized age and skill levels. Sanctioned by the US Figure Skating Association, the divisions include Beginner, Pre-Juvenile, Preliminary, Open Juvenile, Open Collegiate, and Open Adult (the non-qualifying divisions/ the divisions that do not go to Nationals) and Juvenile, Intermediate, Novice, Junior, Senior, Collegiate, Adult, and Masters (qualifying levels).

ISI (Ice Skating Institute) is another governing body which focuses on a more recreational form of competition and does not have the same divisions as those of the USFSA. Teams can compete in the Tot, Jr. Youth, Youth Sr. Youth, Teen, Collegiate, Adult, or Master age groups, in any of five categories: Formation, Advanced Formation, Skating, Open Skating, and Dance.

While most skaters participating in synchronized skating are female, the rules allow mixed-gender teams.

US Figure Skating Senior Championship

The Senior team level consists of 16 skaters. Skaters must be at least 15 years old and have passed the Novice Moves in the Field test.

USFSA Collegiate Championship
The Collegiate team level consists of teams with 12-20 Figure skaters who must be enrolled in a college or degree program as full-time students. Skaters must also have passed the Juvenile Moves in the Field test.  It is a Varsity Sport at colleges such as Miami University and Adrian College.  Many more have developed club-level collegiate teams without varsity status such as the team at The University of Delaware and the University of Michigan.  The Miami University Synchronized Skating Team has been a trailblazer in collegiate synchronized skating, fielding the first completely funded varsity synchronized skating program in the United States, as well as working towards gaining "Synchro" NCAA status in the United States.

Present day

Why not Synchro Petition 
Although not currently an Olympic sport, it has already been reviewed for Olympic eligibility. In 2007 synchronized skating was selected to be part of the Universiade or World University Games as a demonstration sport. Teams from several countries competed in Turin, Italy with Sweden, Finland, and Russia coming out on top.

"Why Not Synchro" is an ongoing campaign on social media through the hashtag #whynotsynchro and #whynotsynchro2018 on Facebook, Twitter, and Instagram. This was popularized at the Mozart Cup, held in Austria in January 2014. During the medal ceremonies, teams gathered on the ice and created the shape of the Olympic rings. This image was then shared over social media as skaters petitioned to raise awareness of the sport. A petition to the International Olympic Committee was posted on change.org calling for 15,000 signatures and asking the IOC "Synchronized Figure Skating: Make it an Olympic Event." The petition states "The time has come to add this incredible event to the pinnacle of the sport of figure skating."

Effects of COVID-19 
Due to the abrupt appearance of COVID-19, the 2019-2020 season was cut short to ensure safety of all teams. Elite US teams like the Haydenettes and Skyliners were not able to compete internationally due to travel restrictions set in place in late March and early April. The US Figure Skating Association is responsible for the health and well-being of the athletes and members.

Judging

International IJS System 
The competitive levels of synchronized skating, like those in other disciplines of Figure skating, are now judged using the ISU Judging System that was introduced in 2004. Each element is assigned a difficulty level by the technical panel made-up of a technical specialist, assistant technical specialist and a technical controller. Each level of difficulty for a particular element corresponds to a pre-determined base value. The base value is the number of points that are awarded for an executed element before the grade of execution or any deductions are applied. Judges assign a grade of execution from -3 to +3 to each of the elements. Each grade of execution, or GOE, corresponds to a point value. For each element, the highest and lowest GOE values are dropped and the rest are averaged then added to the base value. The sum of all the scores of the elements comprises the Technical Elements score.

Program Component Score 
The judges will award points on a scale from 0.25 to 10 (in increments of 0.25) for five program components to grade overall presentation. As with Grade of Execution (GOEs), the highest and lowest scores for each component are thrown out, and the remaining scores are averaged. The final program components scores are then multiplied by a set factor to ensure the technical score and program components score are balanced.

The five program components are:

 Skating Skills - Overall skating quality, including edge control and flow over the ice surface (edges, steps, turns, speed, etc.), clarity of technique and use of effortless power to accelerate and vary speed.
 Transitions - The varied and/or intricate footwork, positions, movement and holds that link all elements.
 Performance - The involvement of the skater physically, emotionally and intellectually in translating the music and choreography.
 Composition - An intentional, developed and/or original arrangement of all types of movements according to the principles of proportion, unity, space, pattern, structure and phrasing.
 Interpretation of Music - The personal and creative translation of the music to the movement on the ice.

Technical Score 
Each element of the program is assigned a base value, which gives skaters credit for every element they perform. Some elements, such as spins and step sequences, have levels of difficulty on which the base values are established. Judges grade the quality of each element using a grade of execution score within a range of -5 to +5, which is added to or deducted from the base value. GOEs are proportional to the base value of each element. The highest and lowest scores for each element are thrown out, and the remaining scores are averaged to determine the final GOE for each element. The GOE is then added to or subtracted from the base value for each element, and the sum of the scores for all elements forms the technical score.

Segment Score 

The technical score is added to the program components score to determine the segment score (short program/rhythm dance or free skate/dance). The scores for each segment are then added together to determine the competition score. The skater with the highest competition score is declared the winner. In the event of a tie, the team with the highest free program score wins the competition. The IJS is used at events in the national qualifying structure including the U.S. Championships as well as many local competitions at the juvenile through senior levels, including Excel.

6.0 System 
In the United States, the introductory levels of Aspire Beginner, Aspire Pre-Preliminary, Aspire Preliminary, Open Junior, Open Collegiate, Open Adult, and Open Masters are still judged under the 6.0 judging system.  These levels can compete at the regional level but cannot qualify for the national championships. The basic principle of the 6.0 system is a “majority” system. Each event is judged by an odd number of judges, and the winner of the event is the team placed highest by a majority of these judges.

Differences in Judging Systems 
The IJS is based on cumulative points rather than the 6.0 standard of marks and placement. The IJS focuses on the skaters and not the judges. Judges don’t have to use their memory to compare all aspects of every skater and figure out where to place them, but simply evaluate the qualities of each performance.

Highest scores at ISU competitions

Short program

Free skating

Combined total

References

External links
International Skating Union

 
Figure skating disciplines
Ice skating
Ice skating sports
Sports originating in the United States
Women's sports
History of women's sports